This page covers all the important events in the sport of tennis in 2016. Primarily, it provides the results of notable tournaments throughout the year on both the ATP and WTA Tours, the Davis Cup, and the Fed Cup.

ITF

Grand Slam events

Davis Cup

Fed Cup

IOC

2016 Summer Olympics

 August 6–14: Summer Olympics

ATP World Tour Masters 1000
 March 7 – 20: 2016 BNP Paribas Open in  Indian Wells, California
 Men's Singles:  Novak Djokovic
 Men's Doubles:  Pierre-Hugues Herbert /  Nicolas Mahut
 March 21 – April 3: 2016 Miami Open in the 
 Men's Singles:  Novak Djokovic
 Men's Doubles:  Pierre-Hugues Herbert /  Nicolas Mahut
 April 9 – 17: 2016 Monte-Carlo Rolex Masters in  Roquebrune-Cap-Martin
 Men's Singles:  Rafael Nadal
 Men's Doubles:  Pierre-Hugues Herbert /  Nicolas Mahut
 May 1 – 8: 2016 Mutua Madrid Open in 
 Men's Singles:  Novak Djokovic
 Men's Doubles:  Jean-Julien Rojer /  Horia Tecău
 May 8 – 15: 2016 Internazionali BNL d'Italia in  Rome
 Men's Singles:  Andy Murray
 Men's Doubles:  Bob Bryan /  Mike Bryan
 July 23 – 31: 2016 Rogers Cup in  Toronto
 Men's Singles:  Novak Djokovic
 Men's Doubles:  Ivan Dodig /  Marcelo Melo
 August 13 – 21: 2016 Western & Southern Open in  Mason, Ohio
 Men's Singles:  Marin Čilić
 Men's Doubles:  Ivan Dodig /  Marcelo Melo
 October 8 – 16: 2016 Shanghai Rolex Masters in 
 Men's Singles:  Andy Murray
 Men's Doubles:  John Isner /  Jack Sock
 October 29 – November 6: 2016 BNP Paribas Masters in  Paris (final)
 Men's Singles:  Andy Murray
 Men's Doubles:  Henri Kontinen /  John Peers

ATP World Tour 500 series
 February 8 – 14: 2016 ABN AMRO World Tennis Tournament in  Rotterdam
 Men's Singles:  Martin Kližan
 Men's Doubles:  Nicolas Mahut /  Vasek Pospisil
 February 15 – 21: 2016 Rio Open in  Rio de Janeiro
 Men's Singles:  Pablo Cuevas
 Men's Doubles:  Juan Sebastián Cabal /  Robert Farah
 February 22 – 28: 2016 Dubai Tennis Championships in the 
 Men's Singles:  Stan Wawrinka
 Men's Doubles:  Simone Bolelli /  Andreas Seppi
 February 22 – 28: 2016 Abierto Mexicano Telcel in  Acapulco
 Men's Singles:  Dominic Thiem
 Men's Doubles:  Treat Huey /  Max Mirnyi
 April 16 – 24: 2016 Barcelona Open Banc Sabadell in 
 Men's Singles:  Rafael Nadal
 Men's Doubles:  Bob Bryan /  Mike Bryan
 June 11 – 19: 2016 Gerry Weber Open in  Halle
 Men's Singles:  Florian Mayer
 Men's Doubles:  Raven Klaasen /  Rajeev Ram
 June 13 – 19: 2016 Aegon Championships in  London
 Men's Singles:  Andy Murray
 Men's Doubles:  Pierre-Hugues Herbert /  Nicolas Mahut
 July 9 – 17: 2016 German Open in  Hamburg
 Men's Singles:  Martin Kližan
 Men's Doubles:  Henri Kontinen /  John Peers
 July 16 – 24: 2016 Citi Open in  Washington, D.C.
 Men's Singles:  Gaël Monfils
 Men's Doubles:  Daniel Nestor /  Édouard Roger-Vasselin
 October 3 – 9: 2016 China Open in  Beijing
 Men's Singles:  Andy Murray
 Men's Doubles:  Pablo Carreño Busta /  Rafael Nadal
 October 3 – 9: 2016 Rakuten Japan Open Tennis Championships in  Tokyo
 Men's Singles:  Nick Kyrgios
 Men's Doubles:  Marcel Granollers /  Marcin Matkowski
 October 22 – 30: 2016 Erste Bank Open in  Vienna
 Men's Singles:  Andy Murray
 Men's Doubles:  Łukasz Kubot /  Marcelo Melo
 October 22 – 30: 2016 Swiss Indoors in  Basel (final)
 Men's Singles:  Marin Čilić
 Men's Doubles:  Marcel Granollers /  Jack Sock

WTA Premier tournaments
 January 3 – October 22: 2016 WTA Premier tournaments Events

Premier Mandatory
 March 9 – 20: 2016 BNP Paribas Open in  Indian Wells, California
 Women's Singles:  Victoria Azarenka
 Women's Doubles:  Bethanie Mattek-Sands /  Coco Vandeweghe
 March 22 – April 3: 2016 Miami Open in the 
 Women's Singles:  Victoria Azarenka
 Women's Doubles:  Bethanie Mattek-Sands /  Lucie Šafářová
 April 30 – May 7: 2016 Mutua Madrid Open in 
 Women's Singles:  Simona Halep
 Women's Doubles:  Caroline Garcia /  Kristina Mladenovic
 October 3 – 9: 2016 China Open in  Beijing (final)
 Women's Singles:  Agnieszka Radwańska
 Women's Doubles:  Bethanie Mattek-Sands /  Lucie Šafářová

Premier 5
 February 19 – 27: 2016 Qatar Total Open in  Doha
 Women's Singles:  Carla Suárez Navarro
 Women's Doubles:  Chan Hao-ching /  Chan Yung-jan
 May 9 – 15: 2016 Internazionali BNL d'Italia in  Rome
 Women's Singles:  Serena Williams
 Women's Doubles:  Martina Hingis /  Sania Mirza
 July 22 – 31: 2016 Rogers Cup in  Montreal
 Women's Singles:  Simona Halep
 Women's Doubles:  Ekaterina Makarova /  Elena Vesnina
 August 15 – 21: 2016 Western & Southern Open in  Mason, Ohio
 Women's Singles:  Karolína Plíšková
 Women's Doubles:  Sania Mirza /  Barbora Strýcová
 Women's Singles:  Petra Kvitová
 Women's Doubles:  Bethanie Mattek-Sands /  Lucie Šafářová

Premier
 January 3 – 9: 2016 Brisbane International in 
 Women's Singles:  Victoria Azarenka
 Women's Doubles:  Martina Hingis /  Sania Mirza
 January 10 – 15: 2016 Apia International Sydney in 
 Women's Singles:  Svetlana Kuznetsova
 Women's Doubles:  Martina Hingis /  Sania Mirza
 February 8 – 14: 2016 St. Petersburg Ladies' Trophy in 
 Women's Singles:  Roberta Vinci
 Women's Doubles:  Martina Hingis /  Sania Mirza
 February 15 – 20: 2016 Dubai Tennis Championships in the 
 Women's Singles:  Sara Errani
 Women's Doubles:  Chuang Chia-jung /  Darija Jurak
 April 2 – 10: 2016 Volvo Car Open in  Charleston, South Carolina (formerly known as the Family Circle Cup)
 Women's Singles:  Sloane Stephens
 Women's Doubles:  Caroline Garcia /  Kristina Mladenovic
 April 16 – 24: 2016 Porsche Tennis Grand Prix in  Stuttgart
 Women's Singles:  Angelique Kerber
 Women's Doubles:  Caroline Garcia /  Kristina Mladenovic
 June 11 – 19: 2016 Aegon Classic in  Birmingham
 Women's Singles:  Madison Keys
 Women's Doubles:  Karolína Plíšková /  Barbora Strýcová
 June 18 – 25: 2016 Aegon International in  Eastbourne
 Women's Singles:  Dominika Cibulková
 Women's Doubles:  Darija Jurak /  Anastasia Rodionova
 July 18 – 24: 2016 Bank of the West Classic in  Stanford, California
 Women's Singles:  Johanna Konta
 Women's Doubles:  Raquel Atawo /  Abigail Spears
 August 19 – 27: 2016 Connecticut Open in  New Haven, Connecticut
 Women's Singles:  Agnieszka Radwańska
 Women's Doubles:  Sania Mirza /  Monica Niculescu
 September 19 – 25: 2016 Toray Pan Pacific Open in  Tokyo
 Women's Singles:  Caroline Wozniacki
 Women's Doubles:  Sania Mirza /  Barbora Strýcová
 October 17 – 22: 2016 Kremlin Cup in  Moscow (final)
 Women's Singles:  Svetlana Kuznetsova
 Women's Doubles:  Andrea Hlaváčková /  Lucie Hradecká

Non ATP or WTA Championships
 December 31, 2015 – January 2, 2016: 2016 Mubadala World Tennis Championship in 
 In the final  Rafael Nadal def.  Milos Raonic 7–6, 6–3.

See also
2016 ATP World Tour
2016 WTA Tour
Tennis at the 2016 Summer Olympics
2016 ATP Challenger Tour
2016 WTA 125K series
2016 US Open Series
2016 International Premier Tennis League season

International Tennis Hall of Fame
Class of 2016:
Justine Henin, player
Marat Safin, player

References

External links
Official website of the Association of Tennis Professionals (ATP)
Official website of the Women's Tennis Association (WTA)
Official website of the International Tennis Federation (ITF)
Official website of the International Team Competition in Men's Tennis (Davis Cup)
Official website of the International Team Competition in Women's Tennis (Fed Cup)

 
Tennis by year